Lisoneill is a townland of 145 acres in County Fermanagh, Northern Ireland. It is situated in the civil parish of Aghalurcher and the historic barony of Magherastephana. It contains the main part of the small town of Lisnaskea, with the remainder in the townland of Castle Balfour Demesne.

References

Townlands of County Fermanagh
Civil parish of Aghalurcher